

Women's 200 m Butterfly - Final
The Women's 200m Butterfly Final were held on 21 March at 7:07pm.

Women's 200 m Butterfly - Heats
The Women's 200m Butterfly Heats were held on 21 March at 10:00am.

Women's 200 m Butterfly - Heat 01

Women's 200 m Butterfly - Heat 02

External links
 Women's 200m Butterfly Final - Result
 Women's 200m Butterfly Heats - Heat 01 - Result
 Women's 200m Butterfly Heats - Heat 02 - Result

200 metres butterfly
2006 in women's swimming